FSV Union Fürstenwalde is a German football club from Fürstenwalde/Spree, currently playing in the NOFV-Oberliga Nord (V). As with many East German clubs at the time, the club has a complicated history of formations, re-formations, ownership changes, legal changes, name-changes and mergers; however the lineage can be traced back as far back as 1919, with the current incarnation formed in 2002.

History
The roots of the club go back to SC Union 06 Oberschönweide Abt. Fürstenwalde, formed in 1919 as a section of Berlin-based SC Union 06 Oberschöneweide and adopted the name SC Union Fürstenwalde in 1927 after separating from the latter club. Union went through a number of name changes and merger after 1945 but eventually, in 1971, became SG Dynamo Fürstenwalde. Dynamo, affiliated to sports association SV Dynamo and associated with the Stasi, the secret police of East Germany, experienced some success at the second level of GDR football, the DDR-Liga. With the end of East Germany Dynamo was dissolved and Union reformed. In 2002 Union merged with Wacker Fürstenwalde to form the current club.

The club's recent rise through the league system began when it won promotion to the Brandenburg-Liga, the highest league in the state, in 2008. A championship at this level in 2011 took the club up to the NOFV-Oberliga Nord where it played until 2016, when another title there brought Union up to the Regionalliga Nordost for the first time.

Naming history

Honours
The club's honours:
 DDR-Liga Staffel B
 Champions: 1979–80 (as SG Dynamo Fürstenwalde)
 FDGB-Pokal
 Best result: 1988–89 third round
 Brandenburg-Liga (VI)
 Champions: 2010–11
 Landesliga Brandenburg-Süd
 Champions: 2007–08
 Brandenburg Cup
 Champions: 2020
 Runners-up: 2015, 2021
 NOFV-Oberliga Nord (V)
 Champions: 2015–16

References

External links 
 FSV Union Fürstenwalde 

Football clubs in Germany
Football clubs in Brandenburg
Football clubs in East Germany
Association football clubs established in 1919
1919 establishments in Germany
Association football clubs established in 1927
1927 establishments in Germany
Association football clubs established in 1933
1933 establishments in Germany
Association football clubs established in 1946
1946 establishments in Germany
Association football clubs established in 1950
1950 establishments in Germany
Association football clubs established in 1958
1958 establishments in Germany
Association football clubs established in 1961
1961 establishments in Germany
Association football clubs established in 1971
1971 establishments in Germany
Association football clubs established in 1990
1990 establishments in Germany
Association football clubs established in 2002
2002 establishments in Germany
Police association football clubs in Germany